Gail Elliott (born 1966) is an English fashion designer and former model.

Early life 
Elliot was born in Balham, London, in 1966. She is of mixed Anglo-Indian, Scottish and other European ancestry.

Career

Modeling 
Elliot began to model when she was 17 years old, at the suggestion of her ballet teacher. She moved to Tokyo, Japan, where she worked as a model for two years, after which she moved to New York City. Over the years, Elliott modeled for some of the world's major fashion brands such as Versace, Valentino, Armani, Ralph Lauren, Karl Lagerfeld, Calvin Klein, Dolce & Gabbana, Marc Jacobs, Chanel, Tom Ford, and Donna Karan. Elliot worked with photographers such as Steven Meisel and Mario Testino. Her modeling career spanned a period of 24 years.

Little Joe Woman 
Elliot ventured into fashion design, starting a clothing label with her husband Joe Coffey in 2002, which was named Little Joe Woman. The label was started in New York and was subsequently based out of Sydney, Australia. The company's headquarters was later transferred to Bali, Indonesia. Elliot's husband is the brand's CEO while Elliot is its creative director. The brand, which has been described as "a rock-chic, luxe-resort fashion line", originally offered slip dresses and camisoles.

Personal life 
During her first trip to Australia, Elliott was introduced to her now-husband Coffey by INXS lead singer Michael Hutchence, who at the time was the boyfriend of her model friend Helena Christensen. Elliott and Coffey were married in 1997. Her wedding gown was designed by Azzedine Alaïa, while Christensen, Cindy Crawford, and Yasmin Le Bon were some of her bridesmaids.

References 

English female models
Living people
English fashion designers
1966 births
English expatriates in Indonesia
British women fashion designers
People from Balham